George Rendel may refer to:

George Wightwick Rendel (1833–1902), British engineer, and naval architect, son of James Meadows Rendel
Sir George William Rendel (1889–1979), his son, British diplomat